Guerra (literally "war," in Spanish and Italian) is a census-designated place (CDP) in Jim Hogg County, Texas, United States. The population was six at the 2010 census, giving it the distinction of smallest town by population in Texas.

Geography
Guerra is located in southwestern Jim Hogg County at  (26.882615, -98.894466). Farm to Market Road 649 runs through the community, leading north  to Randado and south  to Garceno in the Rio Grande Valley.

Demographics
As of the 2000 census, 8 people, 4 households, and 2 families were residing in the CDP. The population density was 1.4 people per square mile (0.5/km), with 12 housing units at an average density of 2.0/sq mi (0.8/km). The racial makeup of the CDP was 100.00% White, and therefore no individuals were from other races nor any from two or more races, although 75.00% of the population were Hispanic or Latino (included in the white race category).

Out of a total of 4 households, 25.0% had children under the age of 18 living with them, 50.0% were married couples living together, and 50.0% were non-families. 50.0% of all households were made up of individuals, and 25.0% had someone living alone who was 65 years of age or older. The average household size was 2.00 and the average family size was 3.00.

In the CDP, the population was spread out, with 12.5% under the age of 18, 12.5% from 18 to 24, 25.0% from 25 to 44, 37.5% from 45 to 64, and 12.5% who were 65 years of age or older. The median age was 47 years. For every 100 females, there were 33.3 males. For every 100 females age 18 and over, there were 40.0 males.

The median income for a household in the CDP was US$51,250, and the median income for a family was US$51,250. The per capita income for the CDP was US$15,631. None of the population or families were below the poverty line.

Education
Guerra, as with all of Jim Hogg County, is served by the Jim Hogg County Independent School District.

The district has three schools: Hebbronville Elementary School, Hebbronville Junior High School, and Hebbronville High School. All of the schools are considered to be in the Hebbronville community.

References

External links
 Guerra, Tx in Handbook of Texas Online

Census-designated places in Texas
Census-designated places in Jim Hogg County, Texas